Cornelius Keefe (July 13, 1900 – December 11, 1972) was an American film actor.

Selected filmography
 A Society Scandal (1924)
 Those Who Judge (1924)
 Lend Me Your Husband (1924)
The Law and the Lady (1924)
 The Unguarded Hour (1925)
 The Nut Job (1927)
 Three's a Crowd (1927)
 Satan and the Woman (1928)
 The Man from Headquarters (1928)
 Hearts of Men (1928)
 Thundergod (1928)
 The Cohens and the Kellys in Atlantic City (1929)
 Disorderly Conduct (1932)
 Mystery Liner (1934)
 Thunder in the Night (1934)
 Death from a Distance (1935)
 Western Courage (1935)
 Hong Kong Nights (1935)
 Telephone Operator (1937)
 My Old Kentucky Home (1938)

References

Bibliography
 Pitts, Michael R. Western Movies: A Guide to 5,105 Feature Films. McFarland, 2012.

External links

1900 births
1972 deaths
American male film actors
American male television actors
20th-century American male actors